Piniyon (Russian and Tajik: Пинён), is a village in north-western Tajikistan. It is part of the jamoat Fondaryo in Ayni District,  Sughd Region.

It is located on the left bank of the river Nasruddarya, a left tributary of the Fan Darya.

Notes

References

External links
 Sughd province 

Populated places in Sughd Region